Sumas Mountain, also referred to as Canadian Sumas to distinguish it from an identically-named mountain just  to the south in U.S. state of Washington across the border, is a mountain in eastern Fraser Lowland, in the Lower Mainland region of the Canadian province of British Columbia. It sits on the south bank of the Fraser River, west of the smaller Chilliwack Mountain across the Vedder River mouth, and serves as a geographic landmark dividing the Fraser Valley into "Upper" and "Lower" sections. Sumas Peak is an official name for the summit located on the south shore of the Fraser River in the Fraser Valley between Abbotsford and Chilliwack, British Columbia.

The mountain is separated from the Vedder Mountain and the North Cascades by the drained Sumas Lake, now a flatland called Sumas Prairie that is part of the greater floodplain of the Fraser River basin, south of which is a same-named sister mountain (American Sumas) in Washington state's Whatcom County.  West of the mountain is Matsqui Prairie, another floodplain, and north of the Fraser, which lies along the mountain's north flank, are similar floodplains - Nicomen Island and Hatzic Prairie.

The urban area of Abbotsford is located to the mountain's west, and it is home to a number of Abbotsford's suburban areas, notably Clayburn.  In its central portion is the historic community of Straiton, officially named in 1904 for Thomas Bell Straiton who founded a homestead on Sumas Mountain in 1893 and also a store and post office. Its higher eastern reaches tower over Greendale, a community within the City of Chilliwack and is mostly wilderness; the mountain's summit, Sumas Peak, is located in this area, along with Chadsey Lake.

Sumas Mountain Provincial Park is located in the higher, northern reaches of the mountain. Historic industry on the mountain includes livestock and crop farming, logging, and mining, notably brick-clay, which gave rise to the mining community of Clayburn. Farming, gravel mining, and logging continue on the mountain to the present day. Located on the mountain's north foot, adjacent to the Fraser, is a Canadian Forces base naval station.  On its south side is the reserve of the Sumas First Nation.

The mountain protects McDonald Park, a dark-sky preserve, from the light pollution caused by the nearby cities of Abbotsford, Chilliwack, and Mission.

Name
"Sumas" is a Halqemeylem word meaning "a big level opening", referring to the Sumas Prairie area south of the mountain, formerly Sumas Lake.  A common 19th Century spelling of Sumas was "Smess"; Simon Fraser's journal recorded the name as "shemotch".

References

Mountains of the Lower Mainland
Abbotsford, British Columbia